CONPLAN 8888 also known as Counter-Zombie Dominance is a U.S. Department of Defense Strategic Command CONOP document that describes a plan for the nation and its military defending against any zombies. The April 30, 2011 document depicts fictional scenarios of zombie apocalypses for training students in military planning.

References

External links
 
 Unclassified CONPLAN 8888 document
 CONPLAN 8888-11

Zombies